The 1935 Marshall Thundering Herd football team was an American football team that represented Marshall College (now Marshall University) as a member of the Buckeye Athletic Association (BAA) during the 1935 college football season. In its first season under head coach Cam Henderson, the team compiled a 4–6 record, 0–4 against conference opponents, and outscored opponents by a total of 139 to 117. John Zontini was the team captain.

Schedule

References

Marshall
Marshall Thundering Herd football seasons
Marshall Thundering Herd football